Carmarthen ("Merlin's fort" or "Sea-town fort") is the county town of Carmarthenshire and a community in Wales, lying on the River Towy  north of its estuary in Carmarthen Bay. The population was 14,185 in 2011, down from 15,854 in 2001, but gauged at 16,285 in 2019. It has a claim to be the oldest town in Wales – Old Carmarthen and New Carmarthen became one borough in 1546. It was the most populous borough in Wales in the 16th–18th centuries, described by William Camden as "chief citie of the country". Growth stagnated by the mid-19th century as new settlements developed in the South Wales Coalfield.

History

Early history

When Britannia was a Roman province, Carmarthen was the civitas capital of the Demetae tribe, known as Moridunum ("Sea Fort"). It is possibly the oldest town in Wales, recorded by Ptolemy and in the Antonine Itinerary. The Roman fort is believed to date from about AD 75. A Roman coin hoard was found nearby in 2006. Near the fort is one of seven surviving Roman amphitheatres in Britain and only two in Roman Wales (the other being at Isca Augusta, Roman Caerleon). Excavated in 1968, the Carmarthen fort has an arena of 50 by 30 yards (about 46 by 27 metres); the cavea (seating area) is 100 by 73 yards (92 by 67 metres). Veprauskas has argued for identifying it as the Cair Guorthigirn ("Fort Vortigern") listed by Nennius among the 28 cities of Britain in his History of the Britons. Evidence of the early Roman town has been investigated for several years, revealing urban sites likely to date from the 2nd century.

During the Middle Ages, the settlement then known as Llanteulyddog ('St Teulyddog's) accounted one of the seven principal sees (Cantrefi) in Dyfed. The strategic importance of Carmarthen caused the Norman William fitz Baldwin to build a castle there, probably about 1094. The current castle site is known to have been occupied since 1105. The castle itself was destroyed by Llywelyn the Great in 1215, but rebuilt in 1223, when permission was given for a town wall and crenellations, making it one of the first medieval walled towns in Wales. In 1405, the town was captured and the castle sacked by Owain Glyndŵr. The Black Book of Carmarthen of about 1250 is associated with the town's Priory of SS John the Evangelist and Teulyddog.

The Black Death of 1347–1349 arrived in Carmarthen with the thriving river trade. It destroyed and devastated villages such as Llanllwch. Local historians cite the plague pit for the mass burial of the dead in the graveyard that adjoins the Maes-yr-Ysgol and Llys Model housing at the rear of St Catherine Street.

Priory

In 1110, the ancient Clas church of Llandeulyddog, an independent, pre-Norman religious community, became the Benedictine Priory of St Peter, only to be replaced 15 years later by the Augustinian Priory of St John the Evangelist and St Teulyddog. This stood near the river, at what is now Priory Street (SN418204). The site is now a scheduled monument.

Grey Friars
Franciscan Friars (Grey Friars, or Friars minor) became established in the town in the 13th century, and by 1284 had their own Friary buildings in Lammas Street, on a site now holding a shopping centre. The Franciscan emphasis on poverty and simplicity meant the church was smaller (some "70 to 80 feet long and 30 feet broad" – 21/24 by 9 m) and more austere than the older foundations, but this did not prevent an accumulation of treasures, as it became a sought-after location for burial. In 1456 Edmund Tudor, 1st Earl of Richmond died of plague in Carmarthen, three months before the birth of his son, the future King Henry VII. Edmund was buried in a prominent tomb in the centre of the choir of the Grey Friars Church. Other notables buried there were Rhys ap Thomas and Tudur Aled.

The Friary was dissolved in 1538, and many unsuccessful plans were made for the building. Even before the friars had left in 1536, William Barlow campaigned to have the cathedral moved into it from St David's, where the tomb and remains of Edmund Tudor were moved after the Carmarthen buildings were deconsecrated. There were repeated attempts to turn the buildings into a grammar school. Gradually they became ruined, although the church walls were still recognisable in the mid-18th century. By 1900 all the stonework had been stripped off and there were no traces above ground. The site remained undeveloped until the 1980s and 1990s, after extensive archaeological excavations of first the monastic buildings and then the nave and chancel of the church. These confirmed that the former presence of a church, a chapter house and a large cloister, with a smaller cloister and infirmary added later. Over 200 graves were found in the churchyard and 60 around the friars' choir.

Arthurian legend

Geoffrey of Monmouth, writing in 1188, began the legend that Merlin was born in a cave outside Carmarthen. The town's Welsh name, Caerfyrddin, is widely claimed to mean "Merlin's fort", but a reverse etymology is also suggested: the name Merlin may have originated from the town's name in the anglicised form of Myrddin. (See ). An alternative explanation is that Myrddin is a corruption of the town's Roman name, Moridunum, meaning "sea fort."

Legend also had it that if a certain tree called Merlin's Oak fell, it would bring the downfall of the town. Translated from Welsh, it reads: "When Merlin's Oak comes tumbling down/Down shall fall Carmarthen Town." To obstruct this, the tree was dug up when it died; pieces of it remain in the town museum.

The Black Book of Carmarthen includes poems that refer to Myrddin (Ymddiddan Myrddin a Thaliesin, "Conversation of Merlin and Taliesin") and possibly to Arthur (Pa ŵr yw'r Porthor?, "What man is the porter?"). Interpretation of these is difficult, as the Arthurian legends were known by this time and details of the modern form had been described by Geoffrey of Monmouth before the book was written.

Early modern

One of the earliest recorded Eisteddfodau took place at Carmarthen in about 1451, presided over by Gruffudd ap Nicolas.

The Book of Ordinances (1569–1606) is one of the earliest surviving minute books of a town in Wales. It gives a unique picture of an Elizabethan town.

After the Acts of Union, Carmarthen became judicial headquarters of the Court of Great Sessions for south-west Wales. The town's dominant pursuits in the 16th and 17th centuries were still agriculture and related trades, including woollen manufacture. Carmarthen was made a county corporate by a charter of James I in 1604. This decreed that Carmarthen should be known as the 'County of the Borough of Carmarthen' and have two sheriffs. This was reduced to one sheriff in 1835 and the ceremonial post continues to this day.

The Priory and the Friary were abandoned after the dissolution of the monasteries under Henry VIII. The chapels of St Catherine and St Barbara were lost. The Church of St Peter's survived as the main religious establishment. During the Marian persecutions of the 1550s, Bishop Ferrar of St David's was burnt at the stake in the market square – now Nott Square. His life and death as a Protestant martyr are recorded in Foxe's Book of Martyrs.

In 1689, John Osborne, 1st Earl of Danby, was created 1st Marquess of Carmarthen by William III. He was then created Duke of Leeds in 1694, and Marquess of Carmarthen became the courtesy title for the Duke's heir apparent until the Dukedom became extinct on the death of the 12th Duke in 1964.

18th century to present
In the mid-18th century, the Morgan family founded a small ironworks at the east end of the town. In 1786 lead smelting was established to process the ore carried from Lord Cawdor's mines at Nantyrmwyn, in the north-east of Carmarthenshire. Neither of these firms survived for long. The lead smelting moved to Llanelli in 1811. The ironworks evolved into a tinplate works that had failed by about 1900. The borough corporation was reformed by a 1764 charter and again by the Municipal Corporations Act 1835.

In the late 18th century John Spurrell, an auctioneer from Bath, settled in Carmarthen. He was the grandson of Robert Spurrell, a Bath schoolmaster, who printed the city's first book, The Elements of Chronology in 1730. In 1840, a printing press was set up in Carmarthen by William Spurrell (1813–1889), who wrote a history of the town and compiled and published an 1848 Welsh-English dictionary and an 1850 English–Welsh dictionary. Today's Collins Welsh dictionary is known as the "Collins Spurrell". A local housing authority in Carmarthen is named Heol Spurrell in honour of the family.

The origins of Chartism in Wales can be traced to the foundation in the autumn of 1836 of Carmarthen Working Men's Association.

Carmarthen gaol, designed by John Nash, was in use from about the year 1789 until its demolition in 1922. The site is now taken by County Hall, designed by Sir Percy Thomas. The gaol's "Felons' Register" of 1843–1871 contains some of the earliest photographs of criminals in Britain. In 1843, the workhouse in Carmarthen was attacked by the Rebecca Rioters.

The revival of the Eisteddfod as an institution took place in Carmarthen in 1819. The town hosted the National Eisteddfod in 1867, 1911 and 1974, although at least in 1974, the Maes was at Abergwili.

Carmarthen Grammar School was founded in 1587 on a site now occupied by the old hospital in Priory Street. The school moved in the 1840s to Priory Row, before relocating to Richmond Terrace. At the turn of the 20th century, a local travelling circus buried one of its elephants that fell sick and died. The grave is under what was the rugby pitch.

The population in 1841 was 9,526.

World War II prisoner-of-war camps were placed in Johnstown (where the Davies Estate now stands) and at Glangwilli — the huts being used as part of the hospital since its inception. To the west of the town was the "Carmarthen Stop Line", one of a network of defensive lines created in 1940–1941 in case of invasion, with a series of ditches and pill boxes running north and south. Most have since been removed or filled in, but two remain.

The Carmarthen community is bordered by those of Bronwydd, Abergwili, Llangunnor, Llandyfaelog, Llangain, Llangynog and Newchurch and Merthyr, all in Carmarthenshire.

Carmarthen was named as one of the best places to live in Wales in 2017.

Politics and governance
From 1536 until 1832, Carmarthen, as the borough town of Carmarthenshire was a Carmarthen (UK Parliament constituency), electing its own MP to the House of Commons. By the late 18th century, Carmarthen, as one of the largest towns in Wales at the time, was the scene of a succession of hotly contested electoral contests between the Blues (Whigs) and Reds (Tories). These reached a climax in 1831 with the General Election fought in the midst of the Reform Crisis. The contest was characterised by riots and disturbances, described as "exceptional because of their intensity and duration".

From 1832, Carmarthen shared the borough member with Llanelli, which ultimately became dominant due to its larger population. The borough constituency was abolished in 1918. In 1966, Carmarthen attracted widespread attention following the by-election in Carmarthenshire which led to the election of Gwynfor Evans as the first Plaid Cymru MP.

Carmarthen Town Council, established in 1974, and replacing the former Carmarthen Borough Council, consists of 18 town councillors elected from the three wards of the town. Its responsibilities include maintenance of the town's five parks and the town cemetery.

There are two county electoral wards, Carmarthen Town North and South (formerly Carmarthen Town North and Carmarthen Town South) electing three councillors and Carmarthen Town West, electing two councillors to Carmarthenshire County Council.

Climate

Religion

Anglicanism

The Anglican Church in Wales (Eglwys yng Nghymru) has six dioceses. St Peter's is the largest parish church in the Diocese of St David's and has the longest nave: 60 metres from west porch to east window and 15 metres across the nave and south aisle. In 1954, St Peter's became a Grade I listed building. 
 It consists of a west tower, nave, chancel, south aisle and a Consistory Court, built of local red sandstone and grey shale. The tower contains eight bells, of which the heaviest, tuned to E, weighs 15 cwt 18 lb (783 kg).

By the early 19th century, St Peter's was too small to accommodate the congregation, which had grown in line with the town's population. After several false starts a new church, St David's, was consecrated in 1841. Another church in the same western part of the town, Christ Church, opened in 1869 to serve the English-speaking congregation.

Catholicism
St Mary's, Carmarthen is part of the Carmarthen Deanery.

Nonconformity
Carmarthen has several notable nonconformist chapels, some of which date back to the 18th century or earlier.

A Baptist chapel was founded in Dark Gate in 1762 and then moved in 1812 to Waterloo Terrace under the ministry of Titus Lewis. The new chapel became known as the Tabernacle. Another Baptist chapel, Penuel dates from 1786, with the present building erected in 1872. The English Baptist Church in Lammas Street dates from 1870. All three chapels remained open in 2020.

Lammas Street Chapel is the town's oldest Congregational or Independent chapel, traceable back to 1726, with the present building erected a century later. Union Street Chapel, now closed, was formed after a split among the Lammas Street congregation. Priory Chapel in Priory Street, whose current minister is Beti-Wyn James, was founded in 1872 as a branch of Ebenezer, Abergwili.

The earliest Calvinistic Methodist Chapel was Water Street Chapel, which is now closed. It had ties with Peter Williams, who produced a celebrated Welsh-language version of the Bible in the 18th century. Bethania Chapel in Priory Street, dating from 1909, closed shortly after celebrating its centenary.

Landmarks

Carmarthen Castle

Little remains of the medieval castle at Carmarthen, but the old Gatehouse still dominates Nott Square. The motte is also accessible to the public. Castle House, within the old walls, is a museum and Tourist Information Centre.

Carmarthen Bridge

The concrete A484 road bridge across the River Tywi designed by the Welsh architect Clough Williams-Ellis was completed in 1937. It was Grade II listed in 2003. The loss of the original medieval bridge that it replaced caused controversy.

Pont King Morgan
To create better pedestrian access across the River Tywi from the railway station to the town centre, a cable-stayed bridge was constructed in 2005 linking to the foot of Blue Street. The cost was £2.8 million. The bridge was commended in 2007 by the British Constructional Steelwork Association's Structural Steel Design Awards for its high-quality detailing.

Picton's monument

In 1828, a monument was erected at the west end of the town to honour Lieutenant General Sir Thomas Picton, from Haverfordwest, who had died at the Battle of Waterloo in 1815. A statue of Picton, wrapped in a cloak and supported by a baluster above emblems of spears surmounted the column. 

Within a few years, the monument became dilapidated. The entire pillar was taken down in 1846. In the 1970s, the replacement sculptures were rediscovered in Johnstown and are now displayed in Carmarthenshire County Museum.

After demolition of the first monument, a new structure honouring Picton was commissioned from the architect Frances Fowler. The foundation stone was laid on Monument Hill in 1847. In 1984, the top section was declared unsafe and taken down. Four years later, the whole monument was rebuilt stone-by-stone on stronger foundations.

A campaign to remove the monument due to Picton's treatment of slaves arose in the wake of the removal of the Statue of Edward Colston in Bristol on 6 June 2020.

The Nott statue and plaque to Ferrar
A statue of General Nott was erected in 1851. According to the PMSA, "The bronze statue was cast from cannon captured at the battle of Maharajpur. Queen Victoria gave 200 guineas to the memorial fund. The statue occupies the site of the market cross, which was dismantled when the market was resited and Nott Square created in 1846."

The Market Square was where Bishop Robert Ferrar of St Davids was executed in March 1555. A small plaque below the statue of General Nott commemorates the place where he was burned at the stake during the Marian Persecutions.

Listed buildings

The many listed buildings include Carmarthen Guildhall, Capel Heol Awst, Capel Heol Dŵr, Carmarthen Cemetery Chapel, Elim Independent Chapel, English Baptist Church, English Congregational Church, Penuel Baptist Chapel, Christ Church, Eglwys Dewi Sant, Church of St Mary and Eglwys Sant Ioan.

Amenities
Dyfed–Powys Police headquarters, Glangwili General Hospital and a campus of the University of Wales Trinity Saint David are located in Carmarthen.

The former cattle market in the heart of the town became a new shopping centre, which opened in 2010. It includes a multi-screen cinema, a market hall, restaurants and a multi-storey car park. A new market hall opened in 2009.

Transport

Roads
The A40, A48, A484 and A485 converge on Carmarthen. The M4 motorway, which links South Wales with London, terminates at junction 49, the Pont Abraham services, to continue north-west as the dual carriageway A48 and finish at its junction with the A40 in Carmarthen.

Railway
Carmarthen railway station is on the West Wales Line. It opened in 1852. The town has rail links to Cardiff via Swansea to the east and Fishguard Harbour, Milford Haven, Tenby, Pembroke and Pembroke Dock to the west. There are daily direct intercity trains to London. The area suffered a number of rail closures in the 1960s under the Beeching Axe: one to Llandeilo closed in 1963 and one to Lampeter and Aberystwyth in 1965.

Buses
Carmarthen is a stop on the Eurolines bus route 890, linking London with a number of cities and towns in Munster and South Leinster in Ireland. The service may be used to destinations in Ireland, but may not be used to other stops in Britain. There is a Park and Ride service running daily from Monday to Saturday from 7.00 to 19.00 between Nantyci, to the west of Carmarthen town, and the town centre.

Sports
The town has two rugby union teams: Carmarthen Quins and Carmarthen Athletic. Quins currently plays in the Welsh Premier Division league after promotion to the Premiership in the 2008/2009 season. CPC Bears, a rugby league club based in Carmarthen and the regional side for Carmarthenshire, Pembrokeshire and Ceredigion, plays in the Welsh Premier Division of the Rugby League Conference.

The town's semi-professional football team, Carmarthen Town F.C., plays in the Cymru South. Founded in 1948, it plays its home games at Richmond Park. The club colours, reflected in its crest and kit, are gold and black. The town also has a youth football team Carmarthen Stars that plays in the local Carmarthenshire Junior Leagues from the under-12s age group to the under-16s age group.

The town has two golf courses, a leisure centre with an eight-lane, 25-metre swimming pool, where the Carmarthen district swimming club is based, a synthetic athletics track, and an outdoor velodrome. It also has an athletics team, Carmarthen Harriers. A cycle track opened in about 1900 and remains in use. Motorcycle speedway racing was staged in the early 2000s at a track built on the western outskirts of the town. The team raced in the Conference League.

Picton Barracks
Picton Barracks is a military installation based in the west part of the town and used by the Ministry of Defence. Two major units currently reside there.

British Army
224 (Pembroke Yeomanry) Transport Squadron, 157th (Welsh) Regiment, Royal Logistic Corps (Army Reserve)
Detached (Carmarthen) Platoon, 160 Theatre Support Company, 103rd Battalion Royal Electrical and Mechanical Engineers (Army Reserve)

Royal Air Force
621 (Carmarthen) Squadron, Air Training Corps, No. 3 Welsh Wing

Notable people
See :Category:People from Carmarthen
See :Category:People from Carmarthenshire
Joe Allen (born 1990), Wales and Swansea City FC midfielder
Dorothea Bate (1878–1951), archaeo-zoologist
Charles Brigstocke CB (1876–1951), civil servant
Dale Buggins (1961–1981), motorcycle stunt rider
Fflur Dafydd (born 1978), writer and musician
Barry Davies (born 1981), Ospreys full-back
Gareth Davies (born 1990), Scarlets scrum-half
Mark Delaney (born 1976), former Wales and Aston Villa football defender
Wynne Evans (born 1972), opera singer, broadcaster and actor
Rhod Gilbert (born 1968), television host and comedian
Rhodri Gomer-Davies (born 1983) rugby union Scarlets centre
Gorky's Zygotic Mynci (formed 1991), folk/rock band
Geraint Griffiths (born 1949), singer, songwriter and actor
Elis James (born 1980), comedian
Stephen Jones (born 1977), Wales rugby captain
Manon Lloyd (born 1996), cyclist, Global Cycling Network (GCN) presenter
Kate McGill (born 1990), singer/songwriter
Daniel Mulloy (born 1977), screenwriter and director
John Nash (1752–1835), architect living in Carmarthen from 1784
Daniel Newton (born 1989), Scarlets Centre full back
William Norton (1862–1898), Wales international rugby union player 
Ken Owens (born 1987), rugby union Scarlets Centre hooker 
Adam Price (born 1968) Welsh politician,  Leader of Plaid Cymru
Rhys Priestland (born 1987), rugby union Scarlets fullback
Iwan Rheon (born 1985), actor (famous for role in Game of Thrones) and singer/songwriter
Byron Rogers (born 1942), journalist, historian and biographer
Matthew Stevens (born 1977), snooker pro
Nicky Stevens (born 1949), member of pop group Brotherhood of Man, European Song Contest winner
Terence Thomas, Baron Thomas of Macclesfield (1937–2018), Labour Party (UK) politician and banker
Nik Turner (1940-2022), jazz musician
Tudur Aled (c. 1465–1525),  poet buried in Carmarthen's Franciscan graveyard
Philip Vaughan (died 1824), ironmaster and inventor of the ball bearing
Mary Wynne Warner (1932–1998), mathematician
John Weathers (born 1947), rock drummer
Barry Williams (born 1974), British and Irish Lions rugby union hooker 
Scott Williams, Scarlets Centre and Wales rugby union player
David Glyndwr Tudor Williams (1930–2009), first full-time Vice-Chancellor of the University of Cambridge

Twin towns
 Lesneven, Brittany, France
 Santa Marinella, Italy
 As Pontes, Galicia, Spain

References

Further reading

External links

Carmarthenshire County Council
Listed buildings
Historical information and links on GENUKI

 
Towns in Carmarthenshire
Locations associated with Arthurian legend
Staple ports
County towns in Wales
Monasteries dissolved under the English Reformation
Communities in Carmarthenshire